The Agatha Christie indult is a nickname applied to the permission granted in 1971 by Pope Paul VI for the use of the Tridentine Mass in England and Wales. Indult is a term from Catholic canon law referring to a permission to do something that would otherwise be forbidden.

Description
Following the introduction of the Mass of Paul VI to replace the Tridentine Mass in 1969–1970, a petition was sent to the Pope asking that the Tridentine form of the Roman Rite be permitted to continue for those who wished in England and Wales. Some English Roman Catholics had an attachment to the Tridentine Mass, as the Mass which had been celebrated by the English Martyrs of the Reformation and by priests in the years in which Catholicism had been subjected to sometimes severe persecution. However, the petition noted the exceptional artistic and cultural heritage of the Tridentine liturgy, and was signed by many prominent non-Catholic figures in British society, including Agatha Christie, Vladimir Ashkenazy, Kenneth Clark, Robert Graves, F. R. Leavis, Cecil Day-Lewis, Nancy Mitford, Iris Murdoch, Yehudi Menuhin, Joan Sutherland and two Anglican bishops, those of Exeter and of Ripon.

Cardinal John Heenan approached Pope Paul VI with the petition and asked that use of the Tridentine Mass be permitted. On 5 November 1971, the Pope granted the request. Supposedly Paul had read the letter and exclaimed "Ah Agatha Christie!" and so decided to grant the request; giving the indult its nickname. Between then and the granting of the worldwide indult in 1984, the bishops of England and Wales were authorized to grant permission for the occasional celebration of Mass in the old form, with the modifications introduced in 1965 and 1967.

Signatories of the original appeal
The signatories of the original appeal to Pope Paul VI were:

 Harold Acton
 Vladimir Ashkenazy
 John Bayler
 Lennox Berkeley
 Maurice Bowra
 Agatha Christie
 Kenneth Clark
 Nevill Coghill
 Cyril Connolly
 Colin Davis
 Hugh Delargy
 Robert Exeter
 Miles Fitzalan-Howard
 Constantine Fitzgibbon
 William Glock
 Magdalen Gofflin
 Robert Graves
 Graham Greene
 Ian Greenless
 Joseph Grimond
 Harman Grisewood
 Colin Hardie
 Rupert Hart-Davis
 Barbara Hepworth
 Auberon Herbert
 John Jolliffe
 David Jones
 Osbert Lancaster
 F. R. Leavis
 Cecil Day-Lewis
 Compton Mackenzie
 George Malcolm
 Max Mallowan
 Alfred Marnau
 Yehudi Menuhin
 Nancy Mitford
 Raymond Mortimer
 Malcolm Muggeridge
 Iris Murdoch
 John Murray
 Seán Ó Faoláin
 E. J. Oliver
 Oxford and Asquith
 William Plomer
 Kathleen Raine
 William Rees-Mogg
 Ralph Richardson
 John Ripon
 Charles Russell
 Rivers Scott
 Joan Sutherland
 Philip Toynbee
 Martin Turnell
 Bernard Wall
 Patrick Wall
 E. I. Watkin
 R. C. Zaehner

See also
 Preconciliar rites after the Second Vatican Council
 Quattuor abhinc annos

References

External links
 The "Heenan" Indult - The Latin Mass Society website
 Text of the original appeal - Institute of Christ the King website

Tridentine Mass
Catholic Church in England and Wales
Agatha Christie